Nabil Abdul Tahlak (born 10 July 1957) is an Emirati shooter. He competed in the 1996 Summer Olympics.

References

1957 births
Living people
Shooters at the 1996 Summer Olympics
Emirati male sport shooters
Olympic shooters of the United Arab Emirates